The boys' beach volleyball tournament at the 2014 Youth Olympic Games in Nanjing, China, took place between 17 and 27 August at Nanjing Olympic Sports Center.

Thirty-Six pairs were competing, the host country China withdrew their pair. Africa and Asia hosted a single qualification tournament while Europe created a Youth Continental Cup with different zonal stages ending with a final qualification tournament. South America created a six legged tour, though only five events were held where the six countries with the most points qualified and North, Central America and Caribbean hosted four zonal tournaments where the winners qualified to the Youth Olympics and a final tournament where the top two nations qualified. The remaining were Wild Cards.

To be eligible to participate at the Youth Olympics athletes must have been born between 1 January 1996 and 31 December 1999.

Qualification

Main draw
Teams were seeded is the preliminary round according to the following draw:

Competition Formula
The competition formula consist of two rounds, the first a pool round where the 36 teams have been divided into six pools of six, each pool will play round robin. After the pool round is completed, the best team from each pool plus the two best second place teams will advance to the eight-finals; the rest of the second place teams plus the third and fourth place teams from each pool will advance to the Round of 24. The Round of 24 is a single elimination round, the winning teams will play against the eight-finalists in another single elimination round; next the quarterfinals, semifinals and final matches.

On August 17, it was announced that two pools will only consist of five teams due to two pairings being restricted from competition due to an Ebola outbreak in their countries. The results of the matches against these two teams will be a direct forfeit.

Preliminary round

Pool A

|}

|}

Pool B

|}

|}

Pool C

|}

|}

Pool D

|}

Pool E

|}

Pool F

|}

References

Beach volleyball at the 2014 Summer Youth Olympics